Sarnaki  is a village in Łosice County, Masovian Voivodeship, in east-central Poland. It is the seat of the gmina (administrative district) called Gmina Sarnaki.

The village has a population of 1,194.

External links
 Jewish Community in Sarnaki on Virtual Shtetl

References

Sarnaki
Podlachian Voivodeship
Siedlce Governorate
Lublin Governorate
Lublin Voivodeship (1919–1939)